Podari Zhizn is a countrywide Russian non-governmental charitable organization founded in 2006 by actresses Dina Korzun and Chulpan Khamatova. It has sister charities in the United Kingdom (Gift of Life) and in the United States (Podari.Life).

The main goal of the foundation is treatment, support and rehabilitation of children and young adults with oncological, hematological and other life-threatening conditions in Russia and CIS.

History 
The Russian branch of the organization was founded on 26 November 2006 by famous Russian actresses Chulpan Khamatova and Dina Korzun. The idea was proposed by Galina Chalikova, who then became the first director of the organization, and by oncohematologists Galina Novichkova, Alexei Maschan, and Mikhail Maschanov. Previously, similarly named benefit concerts were organized by a group of activists, most prominently by Yuri Shevchuk.

Since then, regular events have been organized in Moscow featuring many Russian celebrities, e.g. Andrey Makarevich, Chaif, Oleg Basilashvili, Alisa Freindlich, Diana Arbenina, Marina Neyolova, Liya Akhedzhakova, Leonid Yarmolnik, Sergei Garmash, Artur Smolyaninov, Viktoriya Tolstoganova, Emmanuil Vitorgan, Konstantin Khabensky, Vyacheslav Butusov, Ilya Lagutenko, Mumiy Troll, Neschastny Sluchai and others.

The foundation established connections with leading medical facilities, such as Dmitry Rogachev National Research Center of Pediatric Hematology, Oncology and Immunology; Russian Children’s Clinical Hospital, Russian Research Center of Radiology, Moscow Regional Oncology Center, N. N. Institute of Neurosurgery, Morozov Children’s Municipal Clinical Hospital, and S.P. Botkin Municipal Clinical Hospital, and oncology centers in Russian regions.

In 2011, the Federal Center for Pediatric Onco-Hematology was established, which received state-of-the-art equipment from Podari Zhizn. The Center delivers treatment to more than one thousand patients annually.

Each year in June, Podari Zhizn organizes The World Children's Winners Games to help children who have overcome cancer get back to normal life and rehabilitate after the long battle with the disease.

Gift of Life 
A UK-based sister charity of Podari Zhizn, Gift of Life, was established on 2 March 2011 in London. The Foundation shares the mission of Podari Zhizn and relies on its expert team of doctors when considering any applications for support. Gift of Life works together with Podari Zhizn and Podari.Life to maximize support and care for children and young adults with cancer in Russian clinics, who might otherwise have no hope for successful treatment. 

The Patrons of Gift of Life include Ralph Fiennes, Katie Melua, Nika Belotserkovskaya,  Princess Katya Galitzine, Pavel Morozov and Ray Powles.

Gift of Life raises funds to pay for costly medications which are essential to treat certain types of cancer but are not yet available in Russia. It also facilitates searches for and activation of suitable bone marrow transplants in international donor registers if a donor cannot be found among the patient’s siblings or parents, or in the Russian register. 

The charity also arranges visits of leading foreign specialists to the Dmitry Rogachev National Medical Research Centre of Paediatric Haematology, Oncology and Immunology  in Moscow to perform surgical operations and pass the unique surgical methods on to the Russian doctors. In addition to these visits Gift of Life provided education programmes for more than 50 doctors in Russia who will in turn save hundreds more lives.

Since 2011 Gift of Life gave hundreds of children from Russia and the CIS successful treatment and a chance to recover from cancer and other terminal illnesses.

Gift of Life gets a lot of support from the Russian-speaking community of the UK and European countries. The charity has organised numerous cultural charitable events in London,attracting a number of prominent philanthropists, entrepreneurs and renowned individuals from the worlds of art, culture, film, music and dance, e.g.Teodor Currentzis, Ralph Fiennes, Vanessa Redgrave, Katie Melua, Stephen Fry, Mark-Francis Vandelli, Vivien Duffield., Natalia Vodianova, Antoine Arnault, Leonard Blavatnik, Erik Bulatov, Uliana Lopatkina, Natalia Osipova, Sergei Polunin, the London Philharmonic Orchestra, Vladimir Jurowski, Vladimir Spivakov, Hibla Gerzmava, Gidon Kremer and many more. 

The main fundraiser of the charity is the annual Russian Old New Year’s Eve Gala  which accounted for most of the foundation’s income over the decade. Since its inception, Gift of Life with the help of its donors managed to support over 580 applications for life-saving medicine and non-medical treatment, spending over £7,000,000 on its programmes, which meant over 480 children and young adults, as well as their families received the Gift of Life’s support. Gift of Life also provided education programmes for more than 50 doctors  who will in turn save hundreds more lives. The most recent data on Gift of Life income and spending can be searched at the Charity Commission website.

Podari.Life 

On 1 June 2015, Podari.Life Inc was founded in the United States by a group of enthusiasts who have volunteered at Podari Zhizn. Its mission is to advance public education about childhood cancer and to increase awareness among medical professionals in Russia.

Mission and goals 

The foundation engages in multiple activities in the field of oncology in Russia. Its stated goals are:

 to raise money for the treatment and rehabilitation of children with cancer and serious blood diseases
 to help the oncology and hematology hospitals that treat children and young adults
 to raise the public awareness of problems faced by seriously ill children
 to promote the voluntary unpaid blood donor movement
 to provide social and psychological aid to the ill children
 to develop the work of volunteer groups at medical centers dealing with pediatric onco-hematology.

It also successfully lobbies for legislative changes and tax incentives that will promote access to anticancer drugs and improve conditions of oncological patients.

Achievements 

Since its creation, the Russian branch of the foundation has helped over 40 000 children and young adults. It is Russia's leading childhood cancer organization and one of the most recognizable independent charity foundations in Russia.
 
In 2012, the founders received a special prize For Humanism by the Russian Academy of Cinema Arts and Science.

References

See also 
 The World Children's Winners Games
 

Organizations established in 2006
Charities based in Russia
Organizations based in Moscow
Medical and health organizations based in Russia